"Of Moose and Men" was the 83rd episode of the M*A*S*H television series, and the eleventh episode of season four. The episode aired on November 21, 1975.

Plot

B.J. Hunnicutt counsels Zelmo Zale who has received a letter from his wife, confessing to an affair. It is revealed that Zale has also been unfaithful and has a local Korean mistress. (The episode gets its title from the racial slur "Moose" sometimes applied to Korean mistresses.)

Hawkeye Pierce saves the life of Colonel Spiker who he had previously argued with and who wanted to have Hawkeye disciplined. Colonel Potter intercedes and Colonel Spiker forgives Hawkeye.

Historical references

B.J. Hunnicutt tells Zale to sign the letter to his wife with his "John Hancock, or Syngman Rhee if you prefer." Syngman Rhee was the president of South Korea at the time of the Korean War.

The movie with Paul Muni and Luise Rainer that B.J. Hunnicutt references when the soldier finds the kimchi pot is The Good Earth.

External links

M*A*S*H (season 4) episodes
1975 American television episodes